The 2017 Cactus Bowl was a post-season American college football bowl game played on December 26, 2017, at Chase Field in Phoenix, Arizona. The game was the twenty-ninth edition of the Cactus Bowl, which was originally known as the Copper Bowl, Insight Bowl and then as the Buffalo Wild Wings Bowl.

The game was one of the 2017–18 bowl games concluding the 2017 FBS football season. The bowl featured the Kansas State Wildcats of the Big 12 Conference against the UCLA Bruins of the Pac-12 Conference, and was the final game of the season for both teams. Kansas State won, 35–17.

Teams
Kansas State and UCLA had met three times previously, most recently in the 2015 Alamo Bowl, with UCLA leading the series, 2–1.

Kansas State Wildcats

UCLA Bruins

It was announced pregame that UCLA quarterback Josh Rosen had not cleared the concussion protocol and would not play. UCLA named Devon Modster to the starting role in Rosen's absence.

Game summary

Scoring summary

Statistics

References

2017–18 NCAA football bowl games
2017
2017
2017
2017 in sports in Arizona
December 2017 sports events in the United States
2010s in Phoenix, Arizona